Dahlia imperialis, or bell tree dahlia, is a large flowering plant, of the family Asteraceae, growing between 8–10 metres tall. It is native to Mexico, Belize, Guatemala, Honduras, El Salvador, Nicaragua, Costa Rica, Panama and south into Colombia and Ecuador.

Many tuberous dahlia can be prepared and consumed like potatoes or cooked carrots; Additionally, the petals can be eaten on green salads or soups, and tree dahlia leaves are used as a dietary supplement by the Q'eqchi' people of San Pedro Carchá, Alta Verapaz, Guatemala.

It is a tuberous, herbaceous perennial, rapidly growing in springtime from its tuber, after a dormant winter period (which may be brief in mild climates). From its underground base, the plant will begin sending up hollow, cane-like, 4-sided stems with swollen nodes and large, tripinnate leaves; foliage near the ground is quickly shed. The pendant or nodding flowerheads are 75-150mm across, with ray florets, typically a lavender or mauvish-pink in colour.

This species is fast-growing, the growth spurt being linked to shorter daylight hours; the tree dahlia usually comes into flower in autumn, before the risk of frost.

Some Dahlia species were brought from Mexico to Europe in the 16th century. D. imperialis was first described in 1863 by Benedikt Roezl (1823–1885), the great Czech orchid collector and traveller who, ten years later (in 1872–73), embarked on a plant odyssey through the Americas.

References

imperialis
Flora of South America
Plants described in 1863